The Layang-Layang railway station is a Malaysian train station located at Layang-Layang, Kluang District, Johor, Malaysia.

See also
 Rail transport in Malaysia

KTM ETS railway stations
Kluang District
Railway stations in Johor